Ioannina Basketball Club (Greek: Ιωάννινα Σύλλογος Καλαθοσφαίρισης),also known simply as Ioannina B.C. or abbreviated as IBC, is a Hellenic Basketball Federation team based in Ioannina, Greece. The men's team is currently participating in Greek B Basket League, the women's team is playing in A ESKAVDE division and the Wheelchair Basketball team is participating in A2 National Division of the OSEKA league.

Men's basketball team

History 

Ioannina B.C. was founded in 2015 under its first name as Ioannina Sports Club, creating a men's basketball team and youth academies. In 2019 two new sections were established, Women's and Wheelchair basketball teams.

In 2015-16 season the team participated in C ESKAVDE(Northwestern Greek Basketball Clubs Association) division winning its promotion without a loss.

In 2016-17 season IBC merged with the neighbouring basketball club of Asteras Kalpakiou changing to its current name of Ioannina Basketball Club and participated in A ESKAVDE division. The team managed to enter the season's playoffs competing for its promotion to the Greek C Basket League but finished in the 3rd position.

In 2017–18 season IBC participated in A ESKAVDE basketball league managing to make its way to the finals where it lost to fellow city club PAS Giannina thus finishing in the 2nd place.

In 2018–19 season IBC won the A ESKAVDE championship and earned its promotion to Greek C Basket League undefeated with a total score of 22–0. In the finals Ioannina BC defeated G.E. Agriniou.

In 2019–20 season amidst the COVID-19 crisis, IBC earned its promotion to Greek B Basket League finishing 3rd before the league was decided to stop due to the coronavirus outbreak.

Players

Current roster

Depth chart

Honours 

C ESKAVDE: Champions (2016)
A ESKAVDE: 3rd place (2017)
A ESKAVDE: 2nd place (2018)
A ESKAVDE: Champions (2019)
G ETHNIKI: 3rd place (2020)

Season by season

Youth Academy 
The IBC youth academy is also based in Ioannina, Greece. In 2019-20 season the U16 team won the ESKAVDE regional championship.

Program 

IBC youth system runs year round and offers full-time and short-time boarding that focus on player development. The system will produce improvement in both physical performance and in the understanding of the game. The program also focuses in introducing individuals in a collaborating environment in order for them to build a strong team spirit both on and off the court.

Vision 
IBC has a well established academy branch in Metsovo and has the ambition to further expand in the region of Epirus. The club's vision is to create a solid pool of young athletes which will strengthen the men's team roster in the years to come.

Women's basketball team

History 
The women's team was founded in 2019 and has presence in A ESKAVDE league. 
The 2019-20 season was interrupted due to the CoVid-19 crisis after only one match.

Wheelchair basketball team

History 
The Wheelchair basketball team was founded in 2019 being the first team of Epirus region to join the OSEKA A2 National Division.

Management and Personnel

Presidential history

Medical team

Staff

Current sponsorships
Gold Sponsor:  Protergia
Official Supporter: Nitsiakos Group, Welcome Stores, Daikkin
Official Sport Clothing Supporter: CAP Sport
Official Health Care Service Provider: Ippokrateio Diagnostic Center
Academies Sponsor: Domaine Glinavos

References

External links 
Club Website 
Official Youtube channel
Official Facebook page 

Ioannina
Basketball teams in Greece
Basketball teams established in 2015